Harper is an unincorporated community in Magoffin County, Kentucky. A post office was established on March 7, 1915, and named after its first postmaster, Nannie Harper Arnett.

References

Unincorporated communities in Magoffin County, Kentucky
Unincorporated communities in Kentucky